Kamogelo Mphela (born 29 November 1999), popularly known as Kamo Mphela, is a South African dancer and singer. She became an internet celebrity after she posted a video of her dancing on her social media account.

Early life and education
Kamo Mphela was born in Soweto ,South Africa and grew up in Emdeni, Soweto. She studied Media at the Boston Media House.

Career
Her passion for dancing started at an early age, when she accompanied her father who worked at YFM and at events where she would perform on stage and dance which eventually led to her getting more exposure through live performances. She later became popular by posting videos on Instagram where she displayed her dancing skills. Before pursuing her dancing career she had tried acting and had got a chance to be an extra on the TV soap Isibaya, but she later realised that it was not for her and she started performing as a dancer at gigs. Her dancing skills eventually got her the name "Queen of Amapiano".

In 2019, she got signed to Major League Music and released her Ep titled, Twentee under the label. She has also released songs such as Suka Emabozen and Menemene and has collaborated with South African singer Busiswa on the single Sbwl and has featured on the MFR Soulz single Amanikiniki ranked #1 on Good Hope FM's SA House Music Top 10 Chart. She has also performed and worked with local musicians such as Nadia Nakai and Killer Kau. She has been featured as a singer and dancer in the amapiano songs such as Sukendleleni and Labantwana Ama Uber. Apart from amapiano, she has also danced to other South African popular music genres including Gqom, kwaito and pantsula.

Discography 
 Twentee (2019)
 Nkulunkulu(2021)

References
 matlock

External links
 

Living people
South African dancers
1999 births
People from Durban
South African women singers
Amapiano musicians